Raoul Billerey (1920 - 2010) was a French actor.

Partial filmography

The Three Musketeers (1953)
Cadet Rousselle (1954) - Un soldat à l'auberge des Trois Pichets / Un garde au Tribunal Révolutionnaire / Un sans-culotte
The Impossible Mr. Pipelet (1955) - Un pompier (uncredited)
La fierecilla domada (1956) - Truhán
Mémoires d'un flic (1956) - Un truand (uncredited)
Ce soir les jupons volent (1956) - Un photographe
Fernand cow-boy (1956) - Mario
The Twilight Girls (1957) - Bill (uncredited)
Action immédiate (1957) - Fondane
Back to the Wall (1958) - (uncredited)
Le Bossu (1959)
Austerlitz (1960) - Savary
Captain Blood (1960) - Un homme de Concini (uncredited)
Captain Fracasse (1961) - Mérindol
Le Miracle des loups (1961) - Jérôme
Cartouche (1962) - Un complice de Cartouche
The Mysteries of Paris (1962) - Amédée
Le Chevalier de Pardaillan (1962) - Bussy
Le masque de fer (1962)
The Reluctant Spy (1963) - Un collaborateur de Thirios
À toi de faire... mignonne (1963)
Shadow of Evil (1964) - Christopher Lemmon
Mr. Freedom (1968)
Naked Childhood (1968) - Roby
Les camisards (1972) - Un brigadier
Les yeux fermés (1972) - Bernard
Les loulous (1976) - Tramoneur - le patron du Favori
Perceval le Gallois (1978) - Gornemant de Goort
Family Rock (1982)
Hors-la-loi (1985) - Le patron de la buvette du dancing
An Impudent Girl (1985) - Antoine Castang
Mon beau-frère a tué ma soeur (1986) - Grand Patron
Betty Blue (1986) - Le vieux policier
Attention bandits! (1986)
The Grand Highway (1987) - Le curé
If the Sun Never Returns (1987) - Denis Revaz
Le moine et la sorcière (1987) - Siméon
Noyade interdite (1987) - Le maire
Chouans! (1988) - Grospierre
The Little Thief (1988) - Rouleau
Après la guerre (1989) - Le maire
Il prete bello (1989) - Grandfather of Sergio
Un type bien (1991) - Tonton
Dien Bien Phu (1992) - Le père Bambourger
Dead Tired (1994) - Le père de Michel Blanc
Revenge of the Musketeers (1994) - Porthos
Les caprices d'un fleuve (1996) - L'abbé Fleuriau
Oranges amères (1996) - Grand-père Tomani
Jet Lag (2002) - Félix's Father
Ripoux 3 (2003) - Raoul, le vétérinaire
À ton image (2004) - Le père de Thomas

1920 births
2010 deaths
Male actors from Nice, France
French stunt performers
French male film actors
French male stage actors
French male television actors